Diamesa is a genus of non-biting midges in the subfamily Diamesinae of the bloodworm family Chironomidae.

Species
The genus includes the following species:

 D. aberrata Lundbeck, 1898
 D. alata Storå, 1945
 D. alpina Tokunaga, 1936
 D. amanoi Makarchenko & Kobayashi, 1997
 D. amplexivirilia Hansen, 1976
 D. ancysta Roback, 1959
 D. arctica Boheman, 1865
 D. bertrami Edwards, 1935
 D. bohemani Goetghebuer, 1932
 D. cheimatophila Hansen, 1976
 D. chiobates Hansen, 1976
 D. chorea Lundbeck, 1898
 D. cinerella Meigen in Gistl, 1835
 D. clavata Edwards, 1933
 D. colenae Hansen, 1976
 D. dactyloidea Makarchenko, 1988
 D. dampfi Kieffer, 1924
 D. davisi Edwards, 1933
 D. filicauda Tokunaga, 1966
 D. garretti Sublette & Sublette, 1965
 D. geminata Kieffer, 1926
 D. goetghebueri Pagast, 1947
 D. gregsoni Edwards, 1933
 D. hamaticornis Kieffer, 1924
 D. haydaki Hansen, 1976
 D. heteropus Coquillett, 1905
 D. hyperborea Holmgren, 1869
 D. incallida (Walker, 1856)
 D. insignipes Kieffer in Kieffer & Thienemann, 1908
 D. japonica Tokunaga, 1936
 D. kasymovi Kownacki & Kownacka, 1973
 D. laticauda Serra-Tosio, 1964
 D. latitarsis Goetghebuer, 1921
 D. lavillei Serra-Tosio, 1969
 D. leona Roback, 1957
 D. leoniella Hansen, 1976
 D. lindrothi Goetghebuer, 1931
 D. longipes Goetghebuer, 1941
 D. macronyx Kieffer, 1918
 D. martae Kownacki & Kownacka, 1980
 D. mendotae Muttkowski, 1915
 D. modesta Serra-Tosio, 1967
 D. nivicavernicola Hansen, 1976
 D. nivoriunda Fitch, 1847
 D. nowickiana Kownacki & Kownacka, 1975
 D. permacra Walker, 1856
 D. plumicornis Tokunaga, 1936
 D. serratosioi Willassen, 1986
 D. simplex Kieffer, 1926
 D. sommermani Hansen, 1976
 D. spinacies Sæther, 1969
 D. spitzbergensis Kieffer, 1919
 D. starmachi Kownacki & Kownacka, 1970
 D. steinboecki Goetghebuer, 1933
 D. Sætheri Willassen, 1986
 D. tenuipes Goetghebuer, 1938
 D. thomasi Serra-Tosio, 1970
 D. tonsa Haliday in Walker, 1856
 D. tsutsuii Tokunaga, 1936
 D. vaillanti Serra-Tosio, 1972
 D. valkanovi Sæther, 1968
 D. veletensis Serra-Tosio, 1971
 D. vernalis Makarchenko, 1977
 D. vockerothi Hansen, 1976
 D. wuelkeri Serra-Tosio, 1964
 D. zernyi Edwards, 1933

References

Chironomidae